The 2009–10 Louisville Cardinals women's basketball team represented the University of Louisville in the 2009–2010 NCAA Division I basketball season. The Cards, coached by Jeff Walz, played their final season at Freedom Hall at the Kentucky Exposition Center in Louisville, Kentucky, before moving into the KFC Yum! Center in Downtown Louisville for the 2010–11 season. The Cardinals were a member of the Big East Conference.

Offseason
April 21, 2009 : Freshman forward Gwen Rucker will play volleyball during the 2009 season while redshirting during the 2009–10 women's basketball season. Rucker was a starter for both the Louisville volleyball and women's basketball teams this past season, helping lead both to NCAA tournament play. Rucker saw action in 32 games for the Cardinals, starting in the final 27 games. She finished the year averaging three points and 2.1 rebounds per game.
April 28, 2009: The University of Louisville women's basketball team will serve as Honorary Grand Marshals of the Pegasus Parade. The Cardinals advanced to the 2009 NCAA Championship game. The 54th annual Parade will begin at 5 p.m. on Thursday, April 30.
April 29, 2009: BasketballScoop.com and ONS PerformanceTM announced that Louisville women's basketball assistant coach Stephanie Norman was named a finalist for their "Coaches of the Year" awards focusing on the "Rising Stars" of the college basketball coaching profession. The finalists were nominated by their peers, and were the 10 leading vote getters in our online voting. Norman joined Walz on the Louisville staff two years ago when he took over the program.
May 5, 2009 : Freshman guards Mary Jackson and Tiera Stephen will not return to the University of Louisville women's basketball team for the 2009–10 season. Jackson and Stephen are currently exploring other options to continue their playing careers.

Exhibition

Regular season

Roster

Schedule

Big East Tournament

Player stats

Postseason

NCAA basketball tournament

Awards and honors

Team players drafted into the WNBA

See also
2009–10 NCAA Division I women's basketball season
2009–10 Louisville Cardinals men's basketball team
Kentucky–Louisville rivalry

References

External links
Official Site

Louisville Cardinals women's basketball seasons
Louisville
Louisville Cardinals women's basketball, 2009-10
Louisville Cardinals women's basketball, 2009-10